Kouts may refer to:

 Kouts (surname)
 Kouts, Indiana, town in Pleasant Township, Porter County, Indiana

See also
 Kout (disambiguation)